Typha laxmannii, common name graceful cattail, is a wetland plant species widespread across Europe and Asia. Typha laxmannii is not as tall as many of the other species in the genus, rarely more than 130 cm high. A noticeable space separates the staminate (male) flowers from the pistillate (female) ones.

References

laxmannii
Aquatic plants
Flora of Europe
Flora of Asia